Shoda (written: , ,  or ) is a Japanese surname. Notable people with the surname include:

, Japanese sport wrestler 
, Japanese baseball pitcher 
, Japanese statesman
, Japanese mathematician
Michelle Shoda (born 1960), American beauty contestant 
, Japanese poet 
, Japanese baseball player 

Japanese-language surnames